Radimovice is a municipality and village in Liberec District in the Liberec Region of the Czech Republic. It has about 400 inhabitants.

Geography
It lies in the Jičín Uplands. The village is urbanistically fused with neighbouring Sychrov.

References

Villages in Liberec District